Ward Creek is a stream in the U.S. state of Oregon. It is a tributary to the Rogue River.

Ward Creek was named after one Oliver J. Ward.

References

Rivers of Oregon
Rivers of Jackson County, Oregon